Ebtissam Zayed Ahmed Mohamed (born September 25, 1996) is an Egyptian road and track cyclist. She competed in the women's sprint event at the 2016 Summer Olympics; she placed 27th in the qualifying round and did not reach the first round. She competed in the women's omnium event at the 2020 Summer Olympics.

For the 2021 season, Mohamed will join the Dubai Police team for its first season at UCI level.

Major results

Track

2015
2nd  Individual pursuit, African Track Championships

2016
African Track Championships
1st  Individual sprint
1st  Points race
1st  Keirin
2nd  Individual pursuit
2nd  500m Time trial
2nd  Team sprint

2017
African Track Championships
1st  Keirin
1st  Individual pursuit
1st  Points race
2nd  Team sprint

2018 
African Track Championships
1st  Individual sprint
1st  Points race
1st  Scratch race
1st  Keirin
1st  Individual pursuit
1st  Team sprint

2019 
African Track Championships
1st  Omnium
1st  Points race
2nd  500m Time trial
2nd  Keirin
2nd  Scratch race
3rd   Madison
National Track Championships
1st  Omnium
1st  Individual pursuit
1st  500m Time trial

2020 
African Track Championships
1st  Omnium
1st  Points race
1st  Scratch race
1st  Individual pursuit
2nd  Team sprint
National Track Championships
1st  Omnium
1st  Keirin

2021 
African Track Championships
1st  Omnium
1st  Points race
1st  Scratch race
1st  Individual pursuit
1st  Madison
2nd  Team sprint

Road

2011
2nd Junior Road Race, Arab Cycling Championships 
3rd Road Race, Pan Arabian Games

2012
Arab Cycling Championships 
2nd Road Race
3rd Time Trial

2013 
African Road Championships
2nd Junior Road Race
2nd Junior Time Trial

2015 
1st Time Trial, Arab Cycling Championships 

2017 
3rd Team Time Trial, African Road Championships

2022
 African Road Championships
1st  Road race
2nd  Time trial
3rd  Team time trial

References

External links

1996 births
Living people
Egyptian female cyclists
Olympic cyclists of Egypt
Cyclists at the 2016 Summer Olympics
Cyclists at the 2020 Summer Olympics